Oscott is a ward in the northwest of Birmingham, England, within the formal district of Perry Barr.

The Ward is centred on the area known as Old Oscott, originally just "Oscott", and should not be confused with nearby New Oscott. It includes the former Booths Farm sand quarry, Aldridge Road Recreation Ground, and Kingstanding Circle. The ward borders the Metropolitan Borough of Walsall and areas such as Perry Beeches and Queslett. Parts fall within Great Barr.

The nearest library serving the ward is Kingstanding Library.

History
The area is mainly a housing estate built in the 1930s and 1940s. Before that time, it was mainly rural farmland.

 Keith Linnecor, - Labour Councillor for Oscott Ward for 25 years until his death in 2020

Population
The 2001 Population Census recorded that there were 24,073 people living in the ward. 9.4% (2,273) of the ward's population consists of ethnic minorities which is low compared to the average percentage of 29.6% for Birmingham.

Local politics

The ward of Oscott is represented on Birmingham City Council by Barbara Dring of the Labour Party.

The ward has adopted a Ward Support Officer.

Oscott Ward Local Action Plan
The Oscott Ward Local Action Plan was a locally organised plan to improve the quality of living within the ward during 2004 and 2005. Through funding from the Neighbourhood Renewal Fund, problems raised by local residents such as vandalism, anti-social behaviour and the cleanliness of the area were tackled.

References

Birmingham City Council: Oscott Ward

External links
1884 Ordnance Survey map of Oscott
1940s Ordnance Survey map of Oscott and surrounding area

Wards of Birmingham, West Midlands
Kingstanding
Great Barr